Pine Tree Gulch is a valley in San Mateo County, California. It contains a small stream which is a tributary of San Gregorio Creek. 

Notes

Valleys of San Mateo County, California
Landforms of the San Francisco Bay Area
Valleys of California